"Through the Season" is the fifteenth single by Japanese recording artist Alisa Mizuki. It was released on May 27, 1998 as the second single from Mizuki's fifth studio album Innocence. The title track was written by Yūko Ebine and composed and produced by Tourbillon keyboardist Hiroaki Hayama. The song was used in commercials for Piknik lactic drinks by Morinaga Milk, starring Mizuki herself. The B-side, "Previous Days," was written and produced by T2ya.

Chart performance 
"Through the Season" debuted on the Oricon Weekly Singles chart at number 49 with 6,250 copies sold in its first week. The single charted for three weeks and has sold a total of 11,490 copies.

Track listing

Charts and sales

References 

1998 singles
Alisa Mizuki songs
1998 songs